Maysky (masculine), Mayskaya (feminine), or Mayskoye (neuter) is the name of several inhabited localities in Russia.

Modern localities

Republic of Adygea
As of 2010, one rural locality in the Republic of Adygea bears this name:
Maysky, Republic of Adygea, a settlement in Koshekhablsky District

Altai Krai
As of 2010, two rural localities in Altai Krai bear this name:
Maysky, Rebrikhinsky District, Altai Krai, a settlement in Ziminsky Selsoviet of Rebrikhinsky District
Maysky, Romanovsky District, Altai Krai, a settlement in Maysky Selsoviet of Romanovsky District

Amur Oblast
As of 2010, one rural locality in Amur Oblast bears this name:
Maysky, Amur Oblast, a settlement in Maysky Rural Settlement of Mazanovsky District

Republic of Bashkortostan
As of 2010, two rural localities in the Republic of Bashkortostan bear this name:
Maysky, Republic of Bashkortostan, a selo in Maysky Selsoviet of Iglinsky District
Mayskoye, Republic of Bashkortostan, a village in Verkhnetroitsky Selsoviet of Tuymazinsky District

Belgorod Oblast
As of 2010, two rural localities in Belgorod Oblast bear this name:
Maysky, Belgorod Oblast, a settlement in Belgorodsky District
Mayskoye, Belgorod Oblast, a selo in Selivanovsky Rural Okrug of Valuysky District

Bryansk Oblast
As of 2010, four rural localities in Bryansk Oblast bear this name:
Maysky, Komarichsky District, Bryansk Oblast, a settlement in Kokinsky Selsoviet of Komarichsky District
Maysky, Pochepsky District, Bryansk Oblast, a settlement in Titovsky Selsoviet of Pochepsky District
Maysky, Pogarsky District, Bryansk Oblast, a settlement in Grinevsky Selsoviet of Pogarsky District
Maysky, Surazhsky District, Bryansk Oblast, a settlement in Dalisichsky Selsoviet of Surazhsky District

Republic of Buryatia
As of 2010, one rural locality in the Republic of Buryatia bears this name:
Maysky, Republic of Buryatia, a settlement in Maysky Selsoviet of Kurumkansky District

Chechen Republic
As of 2010, one rural locality in the Chechen Republic bears this name:
Maysky, Chechen Republic, a settlement in Groznensky District

Irkutsk Oblast
As of 2010, three rural localities in Irkutsk Oblast bear this name:
Maysky, Kuytunsky District, Irkutsk Oblast, a settlement in Kuytunsky District
Maysky, Nizhneudinsky District, Irkutsk Oblast, a settlement in Nizhneudinsky District
Mayskaya, a village in Osinsky District

Kabardino-Balkar Republic
As of 2010, one urban locality in the Kabardino-Balkar Republic bears this name:
Maysky, Kabardino-Balkar Republic, a town in Maysky District

Kaliningrad Oblast
As of 2010, five rural localities in Kaliningrad Oblast bear this name:
Maysky, Kaliningrad Oblast, a settlement in Krasnotorovsky Rural Okrug of Zelenogradsky District
Mayskoye, Bagrationovsky District, Kaliningrad Oblast, a settlement in Nivensky Rural Okrug of Bagrationovsky District
Mayskoye, Gusevsky District, Kaliningrad Oblast, a settlement in Kubanovsky Rural Okrug of Gusevsky District
Mayskoye, Polessky District, Kaliningrad Oblast, a settlement in Turgenevsky Rural Okrug of Polessky District
Mayskoye, Slavsky District, Kaliningrad Oblast, a settlement under the administrative jurisdiction of   Slavsk Town of District Significance of Slavsky District

Republic of Kalmykia
As of 2010, one rural locality in the Republic of Kalmykia bears this name:
Maysky, Republic of Kalmykia, a settlement in Tselinnaya Rural Administration of Tselinny District

Kamchatka Krai
As of 2010, one rural locality in Kamchatka Krai bears this name:
Mayskoye, Kamchatka Krai, a selo in Ust-Kamchatsky District

Karachay–Cherkess Republic
As of 2010, one rural locality in the Karachay–Cherkess Republic bears this name:
Maysky, Karachay–Cherkess Republic, a settlement in Prikubansky District

Kemerovo Oblast
As of 2010, three rural localities in Kemerovo Oblast bear this name:
Maysky, Novokuznetsky District, Kemerovo Oblast, a settlement in Kuzbasskaya Rural Territory of Novokuznetsky District
Maysky, Bezlesnaya Rural Territory, Yashkinsky District, Kemerovo Oblast, a settlement in Bezlesnaya Rural Territory of Yashkinsky District
Maysky, Kitatskaya Rural Territory, Yashkinsky District, Kemerovo Oblast, a settlement in Kitatskaya Rural Territory of Yashkinsky District

Khabarovsk Krai
As of 2010, one urban locality in Khabarovsk Krai bears this name:
Maysky, Khabarovsk Krai, a work settlement in Sovetsko-Gavansky District

Republic of Khakassia
As of 2010, one rural locality in the Republic of Khakassia bears this name:
Maysky, Republic of Khakassia, a settlement in Charkovsky Selsoviet of Ust-Abakansky District

Kirov Oblast
As of 2010, two rural localities in Kirov Oblast bear this name:
Maysky, Orichevsky District, Kirov Oblast, a settlement in Orichevsky Rural Okrug of Orichevsky District
Maysky, Yaransky District, Kirov Oblast, a settlement in Kugushergsky Rural Okrug of Yaransky District

Krasnodar Krai
As of 2010, two rural localities in Krasnodar Krai bear this name:
Maysky, Kushchevsky District, Krasnodar Krai, a khutor in Srednechuburksky Rural Okrug of Kushchyovsky District
Maysky, Tuapsinsky District, Krasnodar Krai, a settlement in Agoysky Rural Okrug of Tuapsinsky District

Krasnoyarsk Krai
As of 2010, three rural localities in Krasnoyarsk Krai bear this name:
Maysky, Idrinsky District, Krasnoyarsk Krai, a settlement in Dobromyslovsky Selsoviet of Idrinsky District
Maysky, Shushensky District, Krasnoyarsk Krai, a settlement in Subbotinsky Selsoviet of Shushensky District
Mayskoye, Krasnoyarsk Krai, a settlement in Maysky Selsoviet of Yeniseysky District

Kurgan Oblast
As of 2010, one rural locality in Kurgan Oblast bears this name:
Maysky, Kurgan Oblast, a settlement in Maysky Selsoviet of Kargapolsky District

Kursk Oblast
As of 2010, one rural locality in Kursk Oblast bears this name:
Maysky, Kursk Oblast, a khutor in Bolshezhirovsky Selsoviet of Fatezhsky District

Mari El Republic
As of 2010, two rural localities in the Mari El Republic bear this name:
Maysky, Gornomariysky District, Mari El Republic, a vyselok in Vilovatovsky Rural Okrug of Gornomariysky District
Maysky, Kilemarsky District, Mari El Republic, a settlement in Kumyinsky Rural Okrug of Kilemarsky District

Republic of Mordovia
As of 2010, one rural locality in the Republic of Mordovia bears this name:
Maysky, Republic of Mordovia, a settlement in Surgodsky Selsoviet of Torbeyevsky District

Republic of North Ossetia–Alania
As of 2010, one rural locality in the Republic of North Ossetia–Alania bears this name:
Mayskoye, Republic of North Ossetia–Alania, a selo in Maysky Rural Okrug of Prigorodny District

Novosibirsk Oblast
As of 2010, four rural localities in Novosibirsk Oblast bear this name:
Maysky, Cherepanovsky District, Novosibirsk Oblast, a settlement in Cherepanovsky District
Maysky, Kochenyovsky District, Novosibirsk Oblast, a settlement in Kochenyovsky District
Maysky, Moshkovsky District, Novosibirsk Oblast, a settlement in Moshkovsky District
Mayskoye, Novosibirsk Oblast, a selo in Krasnozyorsky District

Omsk Oblast
As of 2010, one rural locality in Omsk Oblast bears this name:
Maysky, Omsk Oblast, a settlement in Zvezdinsky Rural Okrug of Moskalensky District

Orenburg Oblast
As of 2010, five rural localities in Orenburg Oblast bear this name:
Maysky, Adamovsky District, Orenburg Oblast, a settlement in Maysky Selsoviet of Adamovsky District
Maysky, Alexandrovsky District, Orenburg Oblast, a settlement in Sultakayevsky Selsoviet of Alexandrovsky District
Maysky, Krasnogvardeysky District, Orenburg Oblast, a settlement in Yashkinsky Selsoviet of Krasnogvardeysky District
Maysky, Kvarkensky District, Orenburg Oblast, a settlement in Kvarkensky Selsoviet of Kvarkensky District
Mayskoye, Orenburg Oblast, a selo in Blagodarnovsky Selsoviet of Tashlinsky District

Penza Oblast
As of 2010, two rural localities in Penza Oblast bear this name:
Maysky, Penza Oblast, a settlement in Kirovsky Selsoviet of Serdobsky District
Mayskoye, Penza Oblast, a selo in Maysky Selsoviet of Maloserdobinsky District

Perm Krai
As of 2010, one rural locality in Perm Krai bears this name:
Maysky, Perm Krai, a settlement under the administrative jurisdiction of the city of krai significance of Krasnokamsk

Primorsky Krai
As of 2010, two rural localities in Primorsky Krai bear this name:
Mayskoye, Chernigovsky District, Primorsky Krai, a selo in Chernigovsky District
Mayskoye, Khankaysky District, Primorsky Krai, a selo in Khankaysky District

Rostov Oblast
As of 2010, one rural locality in Rostov Oblast bears this name:
Maysky, Rostov Oblast, a khutor in Kirovskoye Rural Settlement of Tselinsky District

Sakhalin Oblast
As of 2010, one rural locality in Sakhalin Oblast bears this name:
Mayskoye, Sakhalin Oblast, a selo in Poronaysky District

Samara Oblast
As of 2010, one rural locality in Samara Oblast bears this name:
Mayskoye, Samara Oblast, a selo in Pestravsky District

Smolensk Oblast
As of 2010, one rural locality in Smolensk Oblast bears this name:
Mayskoye, Smolensk Oblast, a village in Alexandrovskoye Rural Settlement of Monastyrshchinsky District

Tomsk Oblast
As of 2010, one rural locality in Tomsk Oblast bears this name:
Maysky, Tomsk Oblast, a settlement in Pervomaysky District

Tula Oblast
As of 2010, six rural localities in Tula Oblast bear this name:
Maysky, Chernsky District, Tula Oblast, a settlement in Fedorovskaya Rural Administration of Chernsky District
Maysky, Golovenkovskaya Rural Administration, Shchyokinsky District, Tula Oblast, a settlement in Golovenkovskaya Rural Administration of Shchyokinsky District
Maysky, Zhitovskaya Rural Administration, Shchyokinsky District, Tula Oblast, a settlement in Zhitovskaya Rural Administration of Shchyokinsky District
Maysky, Uzlovsky District, Tula Oblast, a settlement in Mayskaya Rural Administration of Uzlovsky District
Mayskoye, Kireyevsky District, Tula Oblast, a selo in Bogucharovsky Rural Okrug of Kireyevsky District
Mayskoye, Kurkinsky District, Tula Oblast, a village in Ivanovskaya Volost of Kurkinsky District

Tver Oblast
As of 2010, one rural locality in Tver Oblast bears this name:
Maysky, Tver Oblast, a khutor in Kuvshinovsky District

Tyumen Oblast
As of 2010, one rural locality in Tyumen Oblast bears this name:
Maysky, Tyumen Oblast, a settlement in Maysky Rural Okrug of Abatsky District

Udmurt Republic
As of 2010, one rural locality in the Udmurt Republic bears this name:
Maysky, Udmurt Republic, a pochinok in Shaberdinsky Selsoviet of Zavyalovsky District

Vladimir Oblast
As of 2010, one rural locality in Vladimir Oblast bears this name:
Maysky, Vladimir Oblast, a settlement in Alexandrovsky District

Volgograd Oblast
As of 2010, two rural localities in Volgograd Oblast bear this name:
Maysky, Volgograd, Volgograd Oblast, a settlement in Gornopolyansky Selsoviet of the city of oblast significance of Volgograd
Maysky, Frolovsky District, Volgograd Oblast, a khutor in Archedinsky Selsoviet of Frolovsky District

Vologda Oblast
As of 2010, two rural localities in Vologda Oblast bear this name:
Maysky, Gryazovetsky District, Vologda Oblast, a settlement in Lezhsky Selsoviet of Gryazovetsky District
Maysky, Vologodsky District, Vologda Oblast, a settlement in Raboche-Krestyansky Selsoviet of Vologodsky District

Voronezh Oblast
As of 2010, one rural locality in Voronezh Oblast bears this name:
Maysky, Voronezh Oblast, a settlement in Ivanovskoye Rural Settlement of Paninsky District

Yaroslavl Oblast
As of 2010, one rural locality in Yaroslavl Oblast bears this name:
Maysky, Yaroslavl Oblast, a settlement in Nazarovsky Rural Okrug of Rybinsky District

Historical localities
Maysky, a former urban-type settlement in Rostov Oblast; since 2004—a part of the town of Shakhty